The Richmond Pacific Railroad  is a terminal railroad owned by the Levin-Richmond Terminal Corporation.

The RPRC also interchanges with the Union Pacific (UP) and BNSF Railway (BNSF). The shipping tariff is a flat rate of $210 per car or $310 per hazardous material car.  The railroad operates two shifts, between 6 a.m. - 10 p.m.  The railroad switches about 3,250 cars per year.

The RPRC was formerly known as the Parr Terminal Railroad .

History

The PRT was incorporated in July 1950 as a terminal railroad to take over the private railroad of Parr-Richmond Industrial Corporation.  In 1911, Terminal 1 was constructed as the primary port of the Port of Richmond.  In the 1930s the City of Richmond entered an agreement with the Parr Company to operate the terminal.  The terminal area was primarily used to unload crude oil from ships into storage tanks that supplied the local oil refineries.  It also was used to transfer ship cargo to rail cars.  The terminal was used as a ferry terminal prior to the opening of the Golden Gate Bridge.

During World War II the U.S. military created the Parr-Richmond Terminal Military Reservation.  The military reservation was created as the result of a lease of  dated April 19, 1943 at the Parr terminal area.  The location was used to support World War II efforts and as warehouse/storage for military shipping at the Port of San Francisco.

References

Further reading

List of California railroads
Pacific Rail News, May 1996 issue.

Switching and terminal railroads
California railroads
Companies based in Richmond, California
Defunct California railroads